The Eunyul talchum is a type of talchum, Korean traditional mask drama which has been handed down in Eunyul, Hwanghae Province, present North Korea. It is also one of sandaenori, a mask dance that developed in Seoul and the mid-metropolitan region. It is designated as the No. 61 asset of the Important Intangible Cultural Properties by South Korea.

The mask drama consists of six acts – Lion Dance, Sangjwa Dance, Mokjung Dance, Old Monk Dance, and Dance of the Old Couple.

Gallery

See also
Talchum
Songpa Sandae Noli
Namsadang nori
Important Intangible Cultural Properties of Korea

References

External links

Korean dance
Important Intangible Cultural Properties of South Korea